DNA-3-methyladenine glycosylase II is an enzyme that catalyses the following chemical reaction:

 Hydrolysis of alkylated DNA, releasing 3-methyladenine, 3-methylguanine, 7-methylguanine, and 7-methyladenine

Involved in the removal of alkylated bases from DNA in Escherichia coli.

Evolution 

Through the process of convergent evolution, there are at least two unrelated protein folds that share the same DNA-3-methyladenine glycosylase activity. The first, the AlkA N-terminal domain, is found in bacteria .  The second, methylpurine-DNA glycosylase (MPG)  is found in vertebrates including humans.

Nomenclature 

DNA-3-methyladenine glycosylase II is also known as 
 deoxyribonucleate 3-methyladenine glycosides II
 3-methyladenine DNA glycosylase II
 DNA-3-methyladenine glycosides II
 AlkA
 alkylated-DNA glycohydrolase (releasing methyladenine and methylguanine)

See also 
MAG1 (DNA-3-methyladenine glycosylase)

References

External links 
 

EC 3.2.2